A partial lunar eclipse took place on Saturday, April 15, 1995, the first of two lunar eclipses in 1995, the second being with a penumbral lunar eclipse on Sunday, October 8.

Visibility 
It was completely visible over eastern Asia, Australia, Pacific and western North America, seen rising over eastern Asia, and setting over western North America.

Related lunar eclipses

Eclipses of 1995 
 A partial lunar eclipse on April 15.
 An annular solar eclipse on April 29.
 A penumbral lunar eclipse on October 8.
 A total solar eclipse on October 24.

Lunar year series 

This is the first of four lunar year eclipses at the ascending node of the moon's orbit.

Saros series

Half-Saros cycle
A lunar eclipse will be preceded and followed by solar eclipses by 9 years and 5.5 days (a half saros). This lunar eclipse is related to two partial solar eclipses of Solar Saros 119.

See also 
List of lunar eclipses
List of 20th-century lunar eclipses

References

External links 
 Saros cycle 112
 

1995-04
1995 in science
April 1995 events